Bahía Drake Airport  is an airport serving Bahía Drake, a Pacific coastal district with a long tradition as a tourist destination in Osa Canton, Puntarenas Province, Costa Rica. The airport is also known as Drake Bay Airport.

It is operated by Costa Rica's Directorate General of Civil Aviation (DGAC).

Airlines and destinations

Passenger Statistics
These data show number of passengers movements into the airport, according to the Directorate General of Civil Aviation of Costa Rica's Statistical Yearbooks.

See also

Transport in Costa Rica
List of airports in Costa Rica

References

External links
OurAirports - Drake Bay Airport

Airports in Costa Rica
Buildings and structures in Puntarenas Province